Calisto is a butterfly genus from the subfamily Satyrinae in the family Nymphalidae. The genus was erected by Jacob Hübner in 1823. Members of the genus occur on the Caribbean islands only. Of the 44 species that are currently thought to exist, eleven occur on Cuba, one on Puerto Rico, one on Anegada Island, one on Jamaica, two on the Bahamas and twenty-eight on Hispaniola.

Species
In alphabetical order:

References

Nymphalidae of South America
Butterfly genera
Taxa named by Jacob Hübner